Wangen an der Aare railway station is a railway station in the municipality of Wangen an der Aare, in the Swiss canton of Bern. It is an intermediate stop on the standard gauge Jura Foot line of Swiss Federal Railways.

Services
 the following services stop at Wangen an der Aare:

References

External links 
 
 

Railway stations in the canton of Bern
Swiss Federal Railways stations